The 1981 Pittsburgh Panthers football team represented the University of Pittsburgh in the 1981 NCAA Division I-A football season. The one-loss Panthers were selected as national champion by NCAA-designated major selector National Championship Foundation and also by Montgomery Full Season Championship. The school does not claim a national championship for this season.

Schedule

Roster

Coaching staff

Season summary

Illinois

Cincinnati

at South Carolina

at West Virginia

#11 Florida State

Syracuse

at Boston College

at Rutgers

Army

at Temple

#11 Penn State

vs. #2 Georgia (Sugar Bowl)

Team players drafted into the NFL

Awards and honors 
Dan Marino, Fourth in Heisman Trophy voting

Media

Radio

References

Pittsburgh
Pittsburgh Panthers football seasons
Sugar Bowl champion seasons
Pittsburgh Panthers football